"Sweet Memory" is a 1983 song by English pop/new wave band The Belle Stars, released as their eighth single overall. Unlike its predecessor, Sign of the Times, it did not make it into the top 10. However, it did manage to get into the top 30, peaking at #22.

Background
Sweet Memory is a song that conveys how much hatred the singer and the lover used to show each other, and how the lover should stop wasting his love by cheating on other people. The singer explains how she brings back terrible memories when thinking about how much hatred her and her lover portrayed.

Bridge
The bridge of the song features many different vocal styles sung by Jennie Matthias. First, she sings vocal hiccups, then does grunting, and, towards the end of the bridge, does a scream.

Music video
The music video for the song features the band performing live. It was produced by Pete Collins.

Track listings
Germany Vinyl 7" Single (6 13880)
 "Sweet Memory"
 "Sign of the Times"

UK Vinyl 7" Single (BUY 174)
 "Sweet Memory"
 "April Fool"

Spain Vinyl 12" Maxi-Single (VIC-97)
 "Sweet Memory" (Extended Remix)
 "April Fool"
 "The Entertainer" (Extended Version)
 "Indian Summer" (Extended Remix)

UK Vinyl 12" Single (BUY-IT 174)
 "Sweet Memory" (Extended Remix)
 "April Fool"

References

1983 singles
The Belle Stars songs
1983 songs
Stiff Records singles